Karla Michelle MacFarlane (born 1969) is a Canadian politician, who was elected to the Nova Scotia House of Assembly in the 2013 provincial election. A member of the Progressive Conservative Party of Nova Scotia, she represents the electoral district of Pictou West. MacFarlane is a graduate of Husson University in Maine with an associate degree in Business Communications. In 2016, MacFarlane was named "Legislator of the Year" at the non-profit Springtide Collective's Better Politics Awards.

She was re-elected in the 2017 provincial election.

MacFarlane was appointed interim leader of the Progressive Conservative party and Leader of the Opposition on January 24, 2018, when her predecessor, Jamie Baillie, was forced to resign due to allegations of inappropriate behaviour. She was succeeded by Tim Houston on October 27, 2018.

On August 31, 2021, MacFarlane was made Minister of Community Services as well as Minister Responsible for the Status of Women and the Office of L'nu Affairs. The latter appointment caused backlash among some Nova Scotians as MacFarlane is white as well as the fact that the riding she represents has no First Nations communities.

MacFarlane is mother to Chloe and Jack.

Electoral record

|-
 
|Progressive Conservative
|Karla MacFarlane
|align="right"|3,026
|align="right"|40.10
|align="right"|
|-
 
|New Democratic Party
|Charlie Parker
|align="right"|2,588
|align="right"|34.29
|align="right"|
|-
 
|Liberal
|Glennie Langille
|align="right"|1,933
|align="right"|25.61
|align="right"|
|}

References

1969 births
Living people
Progressive Conservative Association of Nova Scotia MLAs
People from Pictou County
Women MLAs in Nova Scotia
Members of the Executive Council of Nova Scotia
21st-century Canadian politicians
21st-century Canadian women politicians
Nova Scotia political party leaders
Female Canadian political party leaders
Husson University alumni